Machynys, or Machynys Peninsula is a coastal area just to the south of Llanelli in Carmarthenshire, Wales. In the nineteenth century an industrial community lived here working at the brickworks and tinplate works that occupied the site. When the industrial activity ceased in the mid-twentieth century, the buildings were demolished and the site lay derelict. It has now been redeveloped as a golf course as part of the Llanelli Waterside regeneration plan.

History
Machynys translates from the Welsh as "Monk's Island", and thus, local legend holds that the area was home to a monastery built by Saint Pyr in 513, although there is no concrete evidence of its existence. Another meaning of the name's origin is that it was Calle "Bach ynys" meaning "small island", and the "b" turned into an "m" (Bachynys-Machynys).  It is further assumed from its name that Machynys was once an island, at least at high tide. It was shown as an island on a map of the Stepney Estate as late as 1761.

Until the mid-nineteenth century a single farm occupied the site, but after the Enclosure Acts enabled common land to be developed, industrial development began at Machynys with the digging of clay and the opening of the first of three brickworks. The row of cottages known as "Brick Row" was probably built then. After the tinplate industry got underway at Kidwelly and Llanelli, a tinplate works was built at Machynys in 1872 that became known as the "South Wales Works". Two other tinplate works opened on the peninsular in 1910 and 1912 and workers housing was built. The tinplate was mostly exported to America. 

In 1951, a huge new tinplate factory was opened at Trostre on the other side of Llanelli. The Machynys factories could not compete and closed by 1961. Many of the workers moved to Trostre, their houses and the tinplate works were demolished. For many years the site remained largely derelict awaiting abortive regeneration plans.

The site has been transformed beyond recognition since 1960. It is now home to the Machynys Peninsula Golf Club which hosted the Wales Ladies Championship of Europe from 2005 to 2008. To the west of the golf course lies a recent development, Nicklaus Village, that consists of 175 New England style homes. Machynys is part of the Welsh Assembly Government's Llanelli Waterside regeneration plan.

The Llanelli Millennium Coastal Park, which includes National Cycle Network route 4, runs along the coast of Machynys. There are scenic views of the Gower Peninsula and the Bury Estuary from along the coast. Machynys Ponds, a Site of Special Scientific Interest notable for its dragonfly population, is immediately to the east of the village of Machynys.

References

Villages in Carmarthenshire
Llanelli
Former populated places in Wales